Ryan Griffiths may refer to:

Ryan Griffiths (guitarist) (born 1978), Australian guitarist
Ryan Griffiths (soccer) (born 1981), Australian footballer